P. silvestrii may refer to:
 Paruroctonus silvestrii, the California common scorpion
 Paulownia silvestrii, a plant species in the genus Paulownia Pegoscapus silvestrii (Grandi), a fig wasp species in the genus Pegoscapus Philodromus silvestrii, Caporiacco, 1940, a crab spider species in the genus Philodromus and the family Philodromidae found in Somalia
 Pseudobiantes silvestrii, Mello-Leitão, 1944, a harvestman species in the genus Pseudobiantes and the family Epedanidae Pseudotyrannochthonius silvestrii, Ellingsen, 1905, a pseudoscorpion species in the genus Pseudotyrannochthonius and the family Chthoniidae'' found in Chile

See also
 Silvestrii (disambiguation)